The 1965 Campeonato Argentino de Rugby   was won by then selection of the Unión de Rugby de Rosario that beat in the final the selection of URBA (Buenos Aires)

After some years the tournament returned to a knock-out format.

That year in Argentina rugby union

National
 The Buenos Aires Championship was won by C.U.B.A.
 The Cordoba Province Championship was won by La Tablada
 The North-East Championship was won by Uni Tucuman

International 
 It was the year of historical tour in South Africa and Rhodesia with the historical victory against Junior Springboks, of the Tests against Section Paloise and the Oxford e Cambridge selection tour.

Knock Out Phases

Semifinals 

 Mar del Plata:M. Casanelli, G. Beverino, A. Omaña, E. Corbacho, R. Fruzcaldo, C. Alonso, H. Tiribelli, E. Ferrari (cap.), J. De la Garma, J. Cabarcos, C. Olivera, N. Cerviño, 0. Arroyo, C. Losada, J. Casanegra. 
Buenos Aires; L. Cazenave, M. Pascual, E. Poggi, A. Rodríguez Jurado, C. Cornille, M. Beccar Varela, L. Gradín, L. García Yáñez, H. Silva, E. Neri, G. Illía, B. Otaño (cap.), G. McCormick, N. González del Solar, R. Foster.

 Rosario J. Seaton, E. España (capitán), J. Benzi, E. Ferraza, E. Quetglas, J. Caballero, O. Aletta de Sylva, J. Cortante, J. Imhoff, M Pavan, M. Bouza, M. Chesta, R. Esmendi, R. Seaton, J. Gómez Kenny Cordoba:  E. Rodríguez, A. Quetglas, E. Meta, J. Ramírez, R. Faya, G. Piuma, J. Del Valle, R. Loyola, J. Masjoán, P. Demo, J. Taleb, J. Imas (capitán), G. Ribera, A. Paz, J. Coceo.

Final 

 Buenos Aires : B. Morgan, C. Cornille, A. Pagano, M. Pascual,  R. Trotta, R. Cazenave, A. Etchegaray, E. Scharenberg, L. García Yáñez,  L. Gradín,  B. Otaño (capitán), A. Anthony, G. McCormick, N. González del Solar, R. Foster. 
Rosario: J. Seaton, E. España (capitán), J. Benzi, E. Ferraza,  E. Quetglas, J. Scilabra, C. Cristie,  J. Imhoff, L. Robin, M. Paván, M. Chesta, M. Bouza, J. Gómez Kenny, R. Seaton. R. Esmendi.

External links 
 Memorias de la UAR 1965
 Rugby Archive

Campeonato Argentino de Rugby
Argentina
rugby